Auguste Müller (1847 in Seiffen – 1930) was a German folk carver, who was involved in Seiffen's traditional wooden toymaking. Her works made from waste wood are now counted among the most valuable pieces of Ore Mountain folk art.
She followed in her father's footsteps as a toymaker. Müller was noted for her use of metaphor in her carvings, which she made with a particular sensitivity. The Erzgebirgisches Spielzeugmuseum in Seiffen is in possession of some of her works such as the religious "Weihnachtstempel", which she made in 1918.

References

1847 births
1930 deaths
People from Erzgebirgskreis
German woodcarvers
German women sculptors
19th-century German sculptors
19th-century German women artists
20th-century German sculptors
20th-century German women artists
Folk artists
Women woodcarvers